Donald George Abel (December 23, 1894 – July 8, 1980) was an American attorney who served  as a Washington State Supreme Court Justice from 1946 to 1947.

Early life and education

His father, George D. Abel, was a Superior Court Judge of Grays Harbor County, the center of the state's logging industry. In 1913, Don graduated from Hoquiam High School. He attended the University of Washington, where he played football under coach Gil Dobie, and received a B.A. degree in 1917.

In WW I, Abel served in the 91st Division of the U.S. Army, was decorated for gallantry in the Battle of the Argonne, and rose to the rank of captain.

Following his discharge, he returned to the University of Washington School of Law, and was graduated with a LL.B. degree in 1919.

Career

After graduation, Abel engaged in the private practice of law in Chehalis, and then held a series of government posts. From 1922 to 1926, he served as the Prosecuting Attorney of Lewis County.  In 1932 he ran unsuccessfully for the Democratic nomination to Congress in the Third District. From May 1936 to February 1940, Abel was state administrator of the federal Works Progress Administration.

In September 1942, he ran unsuccessfully for a position on the state Supreme Court, losing to John S. Robinson. In 1946, Abel was appointed to Supreme Court as acting Justice during the absence of Walter B. Beals, who was Presiding Judge at the International Military Tribunal I in Nuremberg, Germany.

In 1957, Governor Albert D. Rosellini appointed Abel to the State Public Service Commission, and later to the Washington State Liquor Control Board, where he served as member and chairman.

Personal life

He was married to Marion E. Ross. They had three children, including a daughter, Janice Abel Colby, and twins born on January 20, 1920: Margaret Louise Abel and Don G. Abel, Jr. Don, Jr., graduated from the University of Washington Law School, as did his father, served as Grays Harbor Prosecuting Attorney, and practiced law in Seattle.

Abel, Sr. died July 8, 1980, and is buried in Claquato Cemetery in Chehalis, Washington.

References

1894 births
1980 deaths
University of Washington alumni
University of Washington School of Law alumni
Justices of the Washington Supreme Court
Lawyers from Seattle
People from Chehalis, Washington
Washington Huskies football players
20th-century American judges
United States Army officers
People from Lincoln Center, Kansas
Works Progress Administration workers
20th-century American lawyers